Ginette Leclerc (born Geneviève Lucie Menut; February 9, 1912 – January 2, 1992) was a French film actress. She appeared in nearly 90 films between 1932 and 1978. Her last TV appearance was in 1981. She was born in Ile-de-France, France and died in Paris. She was married to the actor Lucien Gallas. She is possibly best-remembered for her roles in such films as Le Corbeau (1943), The Baker's Wife (1938), Cab Number 13 (1948), and Tropic of Cancer (1970).

Selected filmography

 L'enfant du miracle (1932)
 Pomme d'amour (1932)
 La dame de chez Maxim's (1933)
 The Star of Valencia (1933) - Une girl
 Toto (1933) - La petite femme (uncredited)
 Cette vieille canaille (1933) - (uncredited)
 Adieu les beaux jours (1933) - Marietta
 Ciboulette (1933) - Une cocotte
 Les surprises du sleeping (1933)
 Minuit... place Pigalle (1934) - Irma
 L'hôtel du libre échange (1934) - Victoire
 Dédé (1934) - Une des deux poules
 Compartiment de dames seules (1935) - Isabelle, des 'Folies Bergères'
 Gangster malgré lui (1935)
 L'heureuse aventure (1935)
 Paris Camargue (1935) - Margot, une pensionnaire
 Et moi, j'te dis qu'elle t'a fait de l'oeil (1935) - Francine
 L'école des cocottes (1935) - (uncredited)
 Fanfare of Love (1935)
 Le commissaire est bon enfant, le gendarme est sans pitié (1935) - Le flirt de Breloc
 Les gaîtés de la finance (1936) - Fanny
 La Peur (1936)
 Oeil de lynx, détective (1936) - Janine
 Passé à vendre (1936)
 Bach the Detective (1936) - Zita
 Jacques and Jacotte (1936)
 La peau d'un autre (1937) - Zézette
 La loupiote (1937) - Thérèse - La Sauterelle
 The Man from Nowhere (1937) - Romilda Pescatore Pascal
 La pocharde (1937)
 Les dégourdis de la 11ème (1937) - Nina Vermillon
 Le choc en retour (1937)
 The Call of Life (1937) - Marcelle
 Mon deputé et sa femme (1937) - Florine
 Le fraudeur (1937) - Viviane
 Le gagnant (1937)
 Prison sans barreaux (1938) - Renée
 Tricoche and Cacolet (1938) - Fanny de Saint-Origan dite Fanny Bombance
 The Baker's Wife (1938) - Aurélie Castanier
 Le ruisseau (1938) - Ginette
 Metropolitan (1939) - Viviane
 Coups de feu (1939) - Lisa
 Louise (1939) - Lucienne
 Menaces... (1940) - Ginette
 L'empreinte du Dieu (1940) - Fanny
 Le briseur de chaînes (1941) - Graziella
 Ce n'est pas moi (1941) - Lulu
 Fièvres (1942) - Rose
 Vie privée (1942) - Ginette
 L'homme qui joue avec le feu (1942) - Clara
 La grande marnière (1943) - Rose
 Le mistral (1943) - Stella
 Le chant de l'exilé (1943) - Dolorès
 Le val d'enfer (1943) - Marthe
 Le Corbeau (1943) - Denise Saillens
 Ils étaient cinq permissionnaires (1945) - Georgette
 The Last Penny (1946) - Marcelle Levasseur
 Nuit sans fin (1947) - Rina
 Lawless Roads (1947) - Inès
 Une belle garce (1947) - Raymonde
 Cab Number 13 (1948) - Claudia - une femme machiavélique (segments "Delitto" & "Castigo")
 Passeurs d'or (1948) - Josée
 Jo la Romance (1949) - Martine
 Les eaux troubles (1949) - Augusta
 Millionaires for One Day (1949) - Greta Schmidt
 L'auberge du péché (1949) - Gilberte / Laura
 A Man Walks in the City (1950) - Madeleine
 Les aventuriers de l'air (1950) - Béatrice Webb
 Le Plaisir (1952) - Madame Flora dite Balançoire (segment "La Maison Tellier")
 The House on the Dune (1952) - Germaine
 Le gang des pianos à bretelles (1953) - Ginette
 The Lovers of Lisbon (1954) - Maria
 Gas-Oil (1955) - Mme Scoppo
 The Band of Honest Men (1956) - (uncredited)
 Delincuentes (1957) - Mercedes
 Du sang sous le chapiteau (1957) - La directrice du cirque
 Easiest Profession (1957) - Zozotte
 Double Deception (1960) - Odette
 Le cave se rebiffe (1961) - Léa Lepicard
 Le Chant du monde (1965) - Gina, la vieille
 Joë Caligula - Du suif chez les dabes (1969) - Ariane
 Goto, Island of Love (1968) - Gonasta
 Le grand cérémonial (1969) - La mère
 Tropic of Cancer (1970) - Madame Hamilton
 The Ball of Count Orgel (1970) - Hortense d'Austerlitz
 Popsy Pop (1971) - Brunette with Fan
 Le drapeau noir flotte sur la marmite (1971) - Marie-Ange Ploubaz
 Five Leaf Clover (1972) - L'épicière
 Le Rempart des béguines (1972) - Nina
 Les volets clos (1973) - Félicie
 Elle court, elle court la banlieue (1973) - Madame Blin
 La belle affaire (1973) - Mme Max
 Par ici la monnaie (1974) - Madame Cerise
 En grandes pompes (1974) - La mère de Marcel
 Chobizenesse (1975) - L'habilleuse
 Spermula (1976) - Gromana
 La barricade du Point du Jour (1978) - Mme Bouroche

References

External links

1912 births
1992 deaths
French film actresses
Actresses from Paris
20th-century French actresses